The 2010–11 North West Counties Football League season (known as the 2010–11 Vodkat League for sponsorship reasons) was the 29th in the history of the North West Counties Football League, a football competition in England. Teams were divided into two divisions: the Premier Division and Division One.

Premier Division 

The Premier Division featured three new teams:

 Barnoldswick Town promoted as runners up of Division One
 Rossendale United relegated from the NPL Division One North
 Stone Dominoes promoted as champions of Division One

League table

Division One 

Division One featured three new teams:

 Runcorn Town promoted as 3rd in the West Cheshire League
 Darwen promoted as 8th in the West Lancashire Football League
 Abbey Hey relegated from the Premier Division

League table

References

 http://www.nwcfl.com/archive-league-tables.php?season=201011

External links 
 NWCFL Official Site

2010-11
9